The 2012 Ice Challenge was an international figure skating competition in the 2012–2013 season. It was organized by the Austrian Figure Skating Association and sanctioned by the International Skating Union. Medals were awarded in men's singles, ladies' singles, pair skating, and ice dancing, on the senior, junior, and novice levels. The competition was held in Graz, Austria from 6–11 November 2012.

References

External links
 Entries/Results

Ice Challenge
2012 in figure skating
Ice Challenge